The Virginia Recreation Building is a former community center in Virginia, Minnesota, United States, that was later converted into a factory.  It was designed by architect Frederick German and built in 1923 as an ice hockey and curling rink to provide a public venue for physical development to the working class men largely employed in Iron Range mines.  A generation later, as the gender balance of the city's population evened out, the building was converted into a shirt factory in 1947 to create jobs for women.  The building was listed on the National Register of Historic Places in 1982 for its state-level significance in the themes of industry and social history.  It was nominated for encapsulating the social welfare of the Progressive Era and the robust public spending funded by the mining boom, and the transition to a more gender-balanced population and need to diversify the economy.

The St. Louis County government acquired the building in 2003 and repurposed it as the Northland Office Center.  As of 2018 they are planning to demolish the building to construct a modern government service center.

See also
 National Register of Historic Places listings in St. Louis County, Minnesota

References

1923 establishments in Minnesota
Buildings and structures in Virginia, Minnesota
Defunct sports venues in Minnesota
Government buildings on the National Register of Historic Places in Minnesota
Industrial buildings and structures on the National Register of Historic Places in Minnesota
National Register of Historic Places in St. Louis County, Minnesota
Sports venues on the National Register of Historic Places in Minnesota
Women in Minnesota